Gum Spring is an unincorporated community in Louisa County, Virginia, United States. Gum Spring has a post office with ZIP code 23065.

Providence Presbyterian Church and the Shady Grove School are listed on the National Register of Historic Places.

References

Unincorporated communities in Louisa County, Virginia
Unincorporated communities in Virginia